Markuchi is a rural locality (a selo) in Semenovsky Selsoviet of Svobodnensky District, Amur Oblast, Russia. The population was 206 as of 2018. There are 5 streets.

Geography 
Markuchi is located 43 km northwest of Svobodny (the district's administrative centre) by road. Semyonovka is the nearest rural locality.

References 

Rural localities in Svobodnensky District